Wachanaruka is a former Costanoan settlement in Monterey County, California. It was located on Rancho Salinas; its precise location is unknown.

References

Costanoan populated places
Former Native American populated places in California
Former settlements in Monterey County, California
Salinas Valley
Lost Native American populated places in the United States